Vespa Sprint is a 150cc, 2 stroke scooter made by Piaggio from 1965 to 1976.

The scooter came in two different versions. Early models, called the Vespa Sprint, were made until 1974. Later models, called the Vespa Sprint Veloce, were made from 1969 to 1976.
The big update with the Sprint Veloce was in the engine. The design was altered from the old two port design with the addition of a third transfer port on the top end. The compression ratio was again increased the Sprint's 7.5:1to 7.7:1. 

Originally the model lacked turn signals. However, all Sprint Veloces imported to the U.S. after 1973 had turn signals fitted as standard equipment in order to satisfy American regulations.

Notes

Piaggio Vespa
Motor scooters
Motorcycles introduced in 1965